Microbulbifer salipaludis is a moderate halophilic bacteria. It is Gram-negative, non-motile, non-spore-forming and rod-shaped. The type strain of the species is strain SM-1T (=KCCM 41586T =JCM 11542T).

References

Further reading

Whitman, William B., et al., eds. Bergey's manual® of systematic bacteriology. Vol. 5. Springer, 2012.

External links

LPSN
Type strain of Microbulbifer salipaludis at BacDive -  the Bacterial Diversity Metadatabase

Alteromonadales
Bacteria described in 2003